In the United States, a federal impeachment trial is held as the second stage of the United States federal government's bifurcated (two-stage) impeachment process. The preceding stage is the "impeachment" itself, held by a vote in the United States House of Representatives. Federal impeachment trials are held in the United States Senate, with the senators acting as the jurors. At the end of a completed impeachment trial, the U.S. Senate delivers a verdict. A "guilty" verdict (requiring a two-thirds majority) has the effect of immediately removing an officeholder from office. After, and only after, a "guilty" verdict, the Senate has the option of additionally barring the official from ever holding federal office again, which can be done by a simple-majority vote.

Officers and other key figures in an impeachment trial

Presiding officer

In an impeachment trial of an incumbent president of the United States, the chief justice of the United States serves as the presiding officer. This is per the Constitution, Article I, section 3, clause 6. This provision prevents the vice president of the United States, who is the president of the Senate and generally holds the authority to preside over Senate business, from overseeing an impeachment trial that would elevate him or her to the presidency if the president were removed. This was particularly important at the time of the Constitution's writing, as, before the reforms of the Twelfth Amendment to the United States Constitution, presidents and vice presidents were not elected together on tickets and could potentially be of rival political factions. The Constitution does not specify who should serve as the presiding officer of impeachment trials of persons other than incumbent presidents. The presiding officer in such impeachments is usually the president of the Senate, meaning either the vice president of the United States or, in his or her absence, the president pro tempore of the United States Senate. In trials of officials who are not an incumbent president, the presiding officer, if not the vice president or president pro tempore, is, in practice, selected by a vote of the Senate.

The presiding officer can rule on questions, such as those related to the admission of evidence. Their rulings stand as the Senate's judgment on those particular questions unless the Senate votes to overrule them. Alternatively, the presiding officer can forgo ruling on a question and directly submit it to a Senate vote.

In the 1999 impeachment trial of President Bill Clinton, the second instance of a presidential impeachment, Chief Justice William Rehnquist was a passive presiding officer, once commenting on his stint as presiding officer, "I did nothing in particular, and I did it very well."

Role of Senators

In impeachment trials, the senators are generally referred to as acting as jurors. However,  the 1999 impeachment trial of President Bill Clinton, Senator Tom Harkin objected to the use of the term "jurors", and Chief Justice William Rehnquist agreed with Harkin's position over that of the House impeachment managers (prosecutors), declaring, "The chair is of the view that the senator from Iowa's objection is well taken, that the core - the Senate is not simply a jury. It is a court in this case. And therefore, counsel should refrain from referring to the senators as jurors."

Senators who act as the presiding officer of an impeachment hearing are still permitted to vote in an impeachment.

Under Senate rules for impeachment trials, senators are able to call and subpoena witnesses for a trial. Under the Senate rules for impeachment trials, senators are able to submit written questions to witnesses and to witnesses as well as the prosecution and the defense.

If they desire, a senator may be excused from serving their role in an impeachment trial.

Rule XI trial committees
A Rule XI trial committee is a committee of senators that the Senate may appoint to receive evidence and hear testimony by witnesses on behalf of the Senate, reporting back to the full Senate and providing the full senate with a certified transcript of the proceedings that they witnessed. The use of such a committee allows for the majority of Senators to be absent during the presentation of evidence and witness testimony heard by the committee. Without use of such a committee, all senators would have to be present at the presentation of all evidence and witness testimony. Rule XI committees have been utilized in for four impeachment trials: the 1986 impeachment trial of Judge Harry E. Claiborne, the 1989 impeachment trials of Judges Walter Nixon and Alcee Hastings, and the 2010 trial of Judge Thomas Porteous.

Prosecution

House impeachment managers

The United States House of Representatives appoints impeachment managers, a committee of members of the House who, together, act as the prosecutors in the impeachment trial.

While they are always approved by House vote, how the initial decision of who serves as a managers is arrived at has differed between impeachments. In some impeachments, the House managers have been chosen upon the recommendation of the Chairman of the House Committee on the Judiciary. Another way that has been used is by having the whole house decide by balloting who should serve. In some other impeachment, the speaker of the House has chosen the slate of impeachment managers that were thereafter approved by House vote.

Legal counsel
Outside legal counsel can also be hired to provide advice to the impeachment managers. This was the case, for instance, in both the first and second impeachment trials of Donald Trump.

Defense

Impeached official
An impeached official may appear at their impeachment trial. They may also opt not to appear in-person and instead be represented entirely through counsel.

Private counsel
In impeachment trials, an impeached individual can be represented by private counsel.

House defense team
In Donald Trump's first impeachment trial, in addition to private counsel, he had several House members belonging to his political party work on his defense.

Rules

Constitutional
The Senate is granted the sole authority to try impeached individuals. Impeachment and impeachment trials are provided for by section four of Article Two of the United States Constitution. Impeachment trials are further outlined in section three, clause six of Article One of the United States Constitution.

The Constitution requires that a two-thirds majority vote "guilty" in order for an individual to be convicted and removed from office. There is no process provided to appeal an impeachment verdict. The Constitution also specifies that, after a conviction, the Senate may vote to additionally bar an individual from again holding federal office. The majority needed for this second matter is not specified by the Constitution, and the Senate has, in practice, used a simple majority vote for this.

The Constitution does not elaborate on specifications on the workings of an impeachment trial. Its only further specifications are that the chief justice of the United States presides over presidential impeachment trials, and that each senator must swear an oath. Therefore, the remainder of the mechanics of impeachment trials are left to the determination of the Senate itself.

Senate-adopted rules

Early Senate trials
The first two impeachment trials in United States history (those of William Blount and John Pickering) had each had their own individual set of rules. The nineteen rules established for the trial of Samuel Chase appear also to have been used for the later trials of James H. Peck and West Hughes Humphreys.

Rules in use since 1868
The exact language of the rules used for previous trials could not be utilized for 1868 impeachment trial of President Andrew Johnson because those rules used wording specific to a trial being presided over by an officer of the Senate (as had been the case for all previous impeachment trials), while the Constitution stipulated that impeachments trials for incumbent presidents are to be presided over by the chief justice of the United States. Because of this, a select committee of senators was tasked with developing rules to be used in the impeachment trial of Johnson. The select committee decided that they would create permanent rules that would be used for any future impeachments, declaring it to be, "proper to report general rules for the trial of all impeachments". Indeed, since 1868, impeachment trials in the U.S. Senate have been governed by the rules created for the impeachment trial of Andrew Johnson, known as the "Rules of Procedure and Practice in the Senate when Sitting on Impeachment Trials". Very few changes have been made to these rules since 1868. The rules were not altered  until after the 1935 impeachment trial of Harold Louderback, when a single rule change was made. In the 1970s, the Senate Committee on Rules and Administration explored the possibly of altering the rules in advance of an anticipated impeachment trial that might have resulted from the impeachment process against Richard Nixon, but after to Nixon resigned without being impeached, this was momentarily abandoned. The rule changes explored in the 1970s were not adopted until the Senate acted upon a further recommendation to adopt them in 1986. No further changes have been made since to the rules outlined for the Johnson trial.

Among other things, the rules specify what oaths must be said and the order certain events are to occur in. However, many important matters are left unspecified by these rules.

The Senate rules states that, as soon as impeachment managers are appointed, the Senate must "immediately" receive them.

The impeached official may appear in person at their trial. They may, alternatively, opt not to appear in person at their trial, instead being represented solely through counsel.

Rule XI

Rue XI, allowing for the appointment of "Rule XI committees" was adopted by the Senate in 1934 as a simple resolution offered by Senator Henry F. Ashurst. Rule XI states, 

This rule change was motivated by the 1933 impeachment trial of Judge Harold Louderback, which highlighted the difficulties that could be brought by requiring the attendance of all senators for all aspects of a lengthy impeachment trial during a busy legislative period.

The constitutionality of this rule change was called into question by some senators soon after its passage, motivating the Senate to opt against using a rule committee for the 1936 impeachment trial of Judge Halsted L. Ritter. Its constitutionality was tested by the Supreme Court of the United States in the 1993 Nixon v. United States case, arising from the 1989 impeachment trial of Walter Nixon, in which the Supreme Court upheld the United States Senate's authority to determine its own procedures, which includes its decision to opt for use of Rule XI trial committees.

Other rules

There are no standard rules of evidence adopted by the Senate to be used for impeachment trials. Therefore, the presiding  officer has authority to rule on evidentiary question. Alternatively, the presiding officer may put evidentiary questions to a vote by senators, or an individual senator may make a motion for the senators to hold such a vote.

An impeachment trial can be adjourned sine die at any time by a  simple majority vote, effectively ending a trial without completion. This occurred in the 1868 impeachment trial of Andrew Johnson, with the Senate adjourning sine die without voting on all of the articles of impeachment.

There is an argument that the Senate could hold a "summary trial", reaching their judgment without holding a full trial or hearing evidence. In 1986, the impeachment managers for the trial of Judge Harry E. Claiborne argued that this would be permissible. However, the impeachment managers for the 1999 impeachment trial of Bill Clinton argued that it would not be allowed. In 1999, Senator (and future president) Joe Biden published a memorandum laying out an argument that the Senate has the right to reach a judgment in this manner. This precedent was cited in the Senate's decision to commence with the second impeachment trial of Donald Trump after he had already left office.

The Senate has, by majority votes, multiple times judged that an individual impeached while in office can still be subjected to a trial, conviction, and the penalty of disqualification even after they leave office. Both the Senate and the House have, in the past, judged themselves to be able to utilize their impeachment authorities on former officeholders. The Senate principal precedent for both impeaching a former officeholder and for holding an impeachment trial of a former officeholder is the impeachment and impeachment trial of William W. Belknap, who had resigned as Secretary of War hours before he was impeached in 1876. Many scholars have argued that if impeachment could not apply to former officeholders, then the Senate's power to disqualify individuals from holding future federal office through an impeachment process would be greatly weakened, as there would be a loophole of resigning before this sentence is imposed by the Senate.

Since the Constitution only gives the Senate the power to try an impeached individual, and does not require them to do so, it is possible for the Senate to forgo holding a trial of an impeached individual.

Since the Senate does not need to hold an impeachment trial after a House impeachment, it  can also choose not to hold trials in instances where individuals resigned following impeachment. Of the twenty-one individuals to be impeached by the United States House of Representatives, only Mark W. Delahay  did not face a trial, as the Senate decided not to hold a trial into him after he resigned his office following his impeachment by the House. A trial can also be dismissed without completion. This has been done before in instances when officeholders resigned partway into an impeachment trial against them. The House and the Senate have both each once moved to dismiss impeachment proceedings against officials that resigned partway in to impeachment trials. The Senate did this in 1926 by dismissing the proceedings against Judge George W. English. The House did this by passing a simple resolution in 2009 to end the proceedings against Judge Samuel B. Kent.

The House is not required to immediately transfer the articles of impeachment to the Senate after passage, and can deliberately postpone their transfer if the House desires to, thus delaying the initiation of a trial.

Additional rules are agreed to before an impeachment trial. This includes rules governing significant details of the trial itself, such as whether witnesses will be permitted.  This also includes guidelines governing the presence of news media within the Senate Chamber. The rules adopted regarding press coverage within the Senate chamber have differed between impeachment trials. This also includes mundane details, such as what beverages may be consumed by senators in the Senate Chamber during the trial. By obscure convention, this has tended to be limited to water, sparkling water, and milk.

Proceedings of an impeachment trial under current conventions
Impeachment trials have taken a standard form with several stages. Some of this structure arises directly from the rules that have been utilized for United States federal impeachment trials since the 1868 impeachment trial of Andrew Johnson, while others arise from informal convention. Minimal guidance is provided by the Constitution as to events in trials and their order, other than the stipulation that a vote on whether to disqualify an official from holding federal office again may only be held after a successful vote to convict.

Initial actions by the House and Senate

After an impeachment is adopted in the House, the House appoints the impeachment managers.

After the House has impeached an official, they also send the Senate notification of this action. The Senate, after receiving this notification, then adopts an order informing the House that it is prepared to receive the impeachment managers. Next, the impeachment mangers appear before the bar of the Senate and exhibit the articles of impeachment, transferring the articles to the Senate. After this, the managers return to the House and make a verbal report there.

Ceremonial start and continued steps

A federal impeachment trial ceremonial starts with the House impeachment managers presenting to the Senate the articles of impeachment which the official will be tried on by reading them. After this, the presiding officer takes their oath for the trial, and then proceeds to provide the juror's oath to the senators. The Senate will issue a writ of summons to the impeached official. They will also request that a written answer be filed.

After the oaths are sworn and summons are issued, details for the trial proceedings may be hammered out and procedural work might be undertaken for several days. Senators may set additional rules specific to the trial itself. Documentation provided by both the defense and prosecution are also distributed to senators. Before the arguments stage beings, the Senate might hold a vote to formally approve of the rules to be used for the trial.

Pleading stage
In the pleading stage, on the date specified by the Senate in the writ of summons, the impeached official is to appear either in person to plead or be represented by counsel that will provide a plea on their behalf. The impeached official and their counsel may also demur, arguing that the impeached official is not a civil official that can be subject to an impeachment, or argue that there are not sufficient grounds for impeachment in the articles brought against them. The impeached official may answer the articles brought against them. The House impeachment managers are also permitted to provide a response to such an answer. After the pleading stage, a date will be set for the formal trial to begin.

Argument stage

The formal trial beings with an argument stage. Senators are prohibited from speaking during the argument stage. To start the argument stage, opening statements are presented by both the prosecution and the defense, with the prosecution (represented by the House managers) delivering their opening argument first. After opening statements, each side presents their full case. There are not specified rules as to which side is supposed to present their full case first. Evidence may be presented and witnesses might be examined and cross-examined, with the Senate deciding on whether to allow this.

After arguments are first presented, senators have an opportunity to present written questions to the representation of the two parties to the trial (the prosecution and the defense). Senators are prohibited from speaking during the questioning stage, so their questions are given to the presiding officer who asks the question to the parties on the senators' behalf.

After the questioning stage, further evidence might be brought in and witnesses might be brought in to provide testimony. The Senate may, alternatively, vote to end this part of the trial without allowing for this.

Closing arguments
Closing arguments are presented by both the prosecution and the defense. The House managers, representing the prosecution, will both open and close the final argument stage.

After the closing arguments, the Senate might opt to vote for senators to hold closed-door deliberations to debate among themselves.

Verdict

The verdict ("judgment of the Senate") is delivered in open session. It is possible that, before the Senate would proceed to vote on whether to convict, a senator might motion to introduce a resolution to censure the official. The reason for presenting such a resolution would be to provide an alternate means for the Senate to express dismay about wrongdoings without convicting and removing an official from office.

When the Senate then votes on the verdict, they first vote on whether to convict. Conviction requires a two-thirds majority. Regardless of the number of articles of impeachment that are being tried, conviction on a single article triggers a removal from office for an incumbent officeholder. If a conviction occurs, the Senate then as the option of voting. If the senate votes to convict, they are permitted to hold a second vote as to whether to ban the official from holding federal office again. This second vote only requires a simple majority.

The Senate does not always vote on each article of impeachment. For example: in the 1868 impeachment trial of Andrew Johnson, the Senate voted on only three of the eleven articles of impeachment before adjourning sine die.

Closing procedures
A trial ends with procedural motions. After the close of the trial, senators are given an opportunity to deliver speeches.

Media coverage

The Trial Rule XI committee hearings and subsequent trial of Judge Harry E. Claiborne were televised in 1986. This was the first impeachment trial held after television became a broadly adopted medium.

Political bias of some news outlets have been observed to shape their coverage of presidential impeachments, which have been often seen as highly partisan affairs.

Presidential impeachments have generated significant press coverage.

The Senate sets guidelines for press coverage within the Senate Chamber during impeachment trials.

List of trials
Roughly half of impeachment trials held in the United States Senate have resulted in a verdict of conviction, thereby removing the impeached official.

External links
Impeachment -U.S. Senate

References

Federal
Impeachment trial
trial